is a Japanese voice actress associated with Production Ogi. She debuted in 2000 in Medabots Spirits and has voiced major characters in Bomberman Jetters, Gunslinger Girl: Il Teatrino, Akame ga Kill!, Windy Tales, Le Chevalier D'Eon, Code-E, Shion no Ō, Bakugan Battle Brawlers, and Luck & Logic, as well as supporting characters in AM Driver and Idaten Jump.

Biography
Risa Mizuno was born in Kanagawa Prefecture on 3 November. Her mother was an English-language teacher. She discovered her voice talent during elementary school, and entered a specialized class during vocational school.

Her debut was in the 2000 anime Medabots Spirits. She subsequently starred as Shout in Bomberman Jetters, Yukio in Windy Tales, Lia de Beaumont in Le Chevalier D'Eon, Yuma Saihashi in Code-E, Saori Nikaidō in Shion no Ō, Claes in Gunslinger Girl: Il Teatrino, Julie Makimoto in Bakugan Battle Brawlers, Najenda in Akame ga Kill!, Veronica Ananko in Luck & Logic, and Ōinin in Aguu: Tensai Ningyō.

She also voiced Sera May in AM Driver, Yukie Akasaka in Higurashi When They Cry, Yuki in Idaten Jump, Wakana Nura in Nura: Rise of the Yokai Clan and its sequel Demon Capital, and Haruka Takahashi in Onegai My Melody and its sequel Kuru Kuru Shuffle. A character single for her AM Driver character alongside myco was released from Konami Digital Entertainment on 8 December 2004.

In October 2018, she participated alongside Kenji Mizuhashi and Satomi Hanamura in Makoto Shinkai Sakuhim Audiobook Project, which was released on Audible.

As of November 2014, Mizuno was living in Hiratsuka, where she was a member of Shōnan Teatro Dell'arte.

Filmography

Anime
2000
Medabots Spirits, Nae Akihabara
Yu-Gi-Oh! GX, Cindia
2001
Ask Dr. Rin!, Taeko
Vampiyan Kids, Kana
2002
Bomberman Jetters, Shout
2003
Gunslinger Girl, Elenora Gabrielli
Twin Spica, Yūko Suzunari
2004
Kurau Phantom Memory, Midori Nonaka
Kyo Kara Maoh!, Julia
Shura no Toki – Age of Chaos, Kanae
Windy Tales, Yukio
2005
Absolute Boy, Asako Tōdō
Kyo Kara Maoh! Season 2, Julia
Onegai My Melody, Haruka Takahashi
Sugar Sugar Rune, Ayano Ichijō
2006
Akubi Girl, mother
Artificial insect KABUTO BORG Victory by Victory, Nayo Makumo
BakéGyamon, Uta
D.Gray-man, fan, Jamie Dark
Higurashi When They Cry, Yukie Akasaka
Le Chevalier D'Eon, Lia de Beaumont
Onegai My Melody ~Kuru Kuru Shuffle~, Haruka Takahashi
Reborn!, Oregano
2007
Bakugan Battle Brawlers, Julie Makimoto
Code-E, Yuma Saihashi
Dragonaut: The Resonance, Sherry fw
Higurashi When They Cry Kai, counselor, child, male student
Rental Magica, Diana
Shion no Ō, Saori Nikaidō
Sisters of Wellber, Iona
2008
Gunslinger Girl -Il Teatrino-: Claes
Kyo Kara Maoh! Season 3, Julia
Monochrome Factor, Kiyomi Sonobe
Nabari no Ou, Shigure
The Tower of Druaga: The Aegis of Uruk, Etana
Vampire Knight, Seiren, Sayori Wakaba
Vampire Knight: Guilty, Seiren
Yu-Gi-Oh! 5D's, Maria
2009
Astro Fighter Sunred, Sachi
Cooking Idol: Ai! Mai! Main!, Wakako
Nyan Koi!, Cabaneko
The Beast Player, Je
The Tower of Druaga, Etana
2010
Bakugan Battle Brawlers New Vestrola, Julie Makimoto, Buron
Gokujō!! Mecha Mote Iinchō, Yurina Hoshizaki
Nura: Rise of the Yokai Clan, Wakana Nura
2011
Bakugan Battle Brawlers: Gundalian Invaders, Julie Makimoto
Nura: Rise of the Yokai Clan: Demon Capital, Wakana Nura
2012
Ginga e Kickoff!!, female athlete
Sengoku Collection, Matsuura-sensei
2013
Hakkenden: Eight Dogs of the East Season 2, Kayoko Kaburagi
2014
Akame ga Kill!, Najenda
Mushishi, mother
2015
Go! Princess PreCure, Reiko Kisaragi
The Disappearance of Nagato Yuki-chan, female doctor
2016
Colorful Ninja Iromaki, mother
Luck & Logic, Veronica Ananko
Natsume's Book of Friends, Mino
2017
Hina Logi: from Luck & Logic, Veronica Ananko
2018
Aguu: Tensai Ningyō, Ōinin

OVA
2007
Higurashi When They Cry: Nekogoroshihen, boy
2008
Gunslinger Girl -Il Teatrino-: Claes
2009
Higurashi no Naku Koro ni Rei, classmate (file.02 and file.03)

Film
2004
The Place Promised in Our Early Days, Maki Kasahara
2007
5 Centimeters per Second, Kanae's elder sister
2011
Children Who Chase Lost Voices, Ikeda-sensei

Video games
2003
DreamMix TV World Fighters, Haruna
2004
The Prince of Tennis RUSH & DREAM!, Nanako
2007
Higurashi no Naku Koro ni Matsuri, Yukie Akasaka
2008
Shion no Ō: The Flowers of Hard Blood., Saori Nikaidō
2009
Yu-Gi-Oh! 5D's: Tag Force 4, generic character
2010
Yu-Gi-Oh! 5D's: Tag Force 5, generic character
2011
Yu-Gi-Oh! 5D's: Tag Force 6, generic character
2018
Disaster Report 4 Plus: Summer Memories: Yuko Ichikawa

CD
Calling You, schoolgirl

References

External links
Official agency profile 

Living people
Japanese video game actresses
Japanese voice actresses
People from Hiratsuka, Kanagawa
Sophia University alumni
Voice actresses from Kanagawa Prefecture
Year of birth missing (living people)